Shirley Verrett (May 31, 1931 – November 5, 2010) was an American operatic mezzo-soprano who successfully transitioned into soprano roles, i.e. soprano sfogato. Verrett enjoyed great fame from the late 1960s through the 1990s, particularly well known for singing the works of Verdi and Donizetti.

Early life and education
Born into an African-American family of devout Seventh-day Adventists in New Orleans, Louisiana, Verrett was raised in Los Angeles, California. She sang in church and showed early musical abilities, but initially a singing career was frowned upon by her family. Later Verrett went on to study with Anna Fitziu and with Marion Szekely Freschl at the Juilliard School in New York. In 1961 she won the Metropolitan Opera National Council Auditions.

International career
In 1957, Verrett made her operatic debut in Britten's The Rape of Lucretia under her then-married name of Shirley Carter. She later used the name Shirley Verrett-Carter, and ultimately just Shirley Verrett. In 1958, she made her New York City Opera debut as Irina in Kurt Weill's Lost in the Stars. In 1959, she made her European debut in Cologne, Germany in Nicolas Nabokov's Rasputins Tod. In 1962, she received critical acclaim for her Carmen in Spoleto, and repeated the role at the Bolshoi Theatre in 1963, and at the NY City Opera in 1964 (opposite Richard Cassilly and Norman Treigle). Verrett first appeared at the Royal Opera House, Covent Garden in 1966 as Ulrica in Un ballo in maschera.

She appeared in the first concert ever televised from Lincoln Center in 1962, and also appeared that year in the first of the Leonard Bernstein Young People's Concerts ever televised from that venue, in what is now Avery Fisher Hall.

She made her debut at the Metropolitan Opera in 1968, with Carmen, and at La Scala in 1969 in Samson and Dalila. Verrett's mezzo roles included Cassandra and Didon (Berlioz's Les Troyens)-including the Met premiere, when she sang both roles in the same performance, Verdi's Ulrica, Amneris, Eboli, Azucena, Saint-Saëns' Dalila, Donizetti's Elisabetta I (written as a soprano role) in Maria Stuarda, Leonora in La favorita, Christoph Willibald Gluck's Orpheus, and Rossini's Neocles (L'assedio di Corinto) and Sinaide in Moïse. Many of these roles were recorded, either professionally or privately.

Beginning in the late 1970s she began to tackle soprano roles, including Selika in L'Africaine, Judith in Bartók's Bluebeard's Castle, Lady Macbeth Macbeth, Madame Lidoine in Poulenc's Dialogues of the Carmelites (Met1977), Tosca, Norma (from Boston 1976 till Messina 1989), Aida (Boston 1980 and 1989), Desdemona (Otello) (1981), Leonore (Fidelio)  (Met 1983), Iphigénie (1984–85), Alceste (1985), Médée (Cherubini) (1986). Her Tosca was televised by PBS on Live from the Met in December 1978, just six days before Christmas. She sang the role opposite the Cavaradossi of Luciano Pavarotti and the Scarpia of Cornell MacNeil.

In 1990, Verrett sang Dido in Les Troyens at the inauguration of the Opéra Bastille in Paris, and added a new role at her repertoire: Santuzza in Cavalleria rusticana in Sienna. In 1994, she made her Broadway debut in the Tony Award-winning revival of Rodgers and Hammerstein's Carousel at Lincoln Center's Vivian Beaumont Theater, playing Nettie Fowler.

In 1996 Verrett joined the faculty of the University of Michigan School of Music, Theatre & Dance as a Professor of Voice and the James Earl Jones Distinguished University Professor of Voice. The preceding year at the National Opera Association Gala Banquet and Concert honoring Mattiwilda Dobbs, Todd Duncan, Camilla Williams and Robert McFerrin, Verrett said: 
I'm always so happy when I can speak to young people because I remember those who were kind to me that didn't need to be. The first reason I came tonight was for the honorees because I needed to say this. The second reason I came was for you, the youth. These great people here were the trailblazers for me. I hope in my own way I did something to help your generation, and that you will help the next. This is the way it's supposed to be. You just keep passing that baton on!

Autobiography
In 2003, Shirley Verrett published a memoir, I Never Walked Alone, in which she spoke frankly about the racism she encountered as a black person in the American classical music world. When the conductor Leopold Stokowski invited her to sing with the Houston Symphony in the early 1960s, he had to rescind his invitation when the orchestra board refused to accept a black soloist. Stokowski later made amends by giving her a prestigious date with the Philadelphia Orchestra.

Family
Verrett married twice, first in 1951, to James Carter, and then, in 1963 to the artist Lou LoMonaco. She was survived by LoMonaco and their adopted daughter Francesca and their granddaughter.

Death
Verrett died in Ann Arbor, Michigan, aged 79, on November 5, 2010, from heart failure following an undisclosed illness.

Honors 

 John Hay Whitney Foundation Grant, Martha Baird Rockefeller Fund scholarship, and Ford Foundation Opera Fellowship
 William Matheus Sullivan Award
 Named an African American Woman of Distinction by Essence Magazine
 Marian Anderson Award (1957)
 Walter W. Naumburg Foundation Award (1958)
 Chevalier des Arts et des Lettres (1970)
 Achievement Award of the Women's Division of the Albert Einstein College of Medicine (1975)
 Honorary Doctor of Musical Arts degree from the College of the Holy Cross (1978)
 Commandeur des Arts et des Lettres (1984)
 Honorary Doctor of Music degree from Northeastern University, Verrett's alma mater (1987)
 Honorary Doctor of Music degree from the Juilliard School (2002)
The Shirley Verrett Award was established at the University of Michigan in 2011 by the Office of the Senior Vice Provost

References

External links

 Shirley Verrett's website
 University of Michigan faculty page

Discography (Capon's Lists of Opera Recordings)
An appreciation
Highlights from Verrett's discography with analysis and discussion by  F. Paul Driscoll
Interview with Shirley Verrett, September 23, 1987

1931 births
2010 deaths
20th-century African-American women singers
20th-century American women opera singers
African-American women opera singers
American musical theatre actresses
American operatic mezzo-sopranos
International House of New York alumni
Juilliard School alumni
Writers from Louisiana
Musicians from New Orleans
University of Michigan faculty
Winners of the Metropolitan Opera National Council Auditions
Singers from Louisiana
African-American women academics
American women academics
African-American academics
21st-century American women